WAOE (channel 59) is a television station licensed to Oswego, Illinois, United States, serving the Chicago television market and primarily airing paid programming from Corner Store TV. Owned by Venture Technologies Group, it is a sister station to WRME-LD (channel 33). WAOE's transmitter is located in Deer Park Township near Starved Rock State Park (in LaSalle County).

Due to WAOE's VHF signal and transmitter location, the station only provides rimshot coverage of Chicago's western and southwestern suburbs, but its broadcast range extends into parts of the Peoria–Bloomington, Rockford and Quad Cities markets. To address the shortfall in coverage in Chicago, WAOE is simulcast on translator WCHU-LD in Oakwood Hills. The station also operates a digital replacement translator on UHF channel 18, licensed to Pekin (with transmitter on High Point Lane near East Peoria).

History

Originally licensed to Peoria, the station signed on the air on July 5, 1999 as a UPN affiliate and aired an analog signal on UHF channel 59. Its studios were located on Fulton Street in downtown Peoria. In its early months, the station broadcast at a low power; WAOE's signal would be upgraded in early 2000, allowing AT&T Cable to add the station to its lineup on February 22. Before WAOE's launch, then-ABC affiliate WHOI (channel 19) had a secondary affiliation with UPN.

On January 24, 2006, The WB and UPN announced the two networks would end broadcasting and merge to form The CW. On February 22, News Corporation announced it would start up another new network called MyNetworkTV. It was made public on March 15 that WAOE would become the market's MyNetworkTV outlet. Meanwhile, cable-only WB affiliate "WBPE" (operated by WHOI) became the area's CW station. In order to offer non-cable viewers access to The CW, WHOI added a new second digital subchannel to simulcast the new network. WAOE would officially join MyNetworkTV on September 5 while WHOI-DT2 started offering The CW 13 days later on the 18th.

On December 1, 2008, the station shut down its analog signal on UHF channel 59 and became digital-exclusive.

Until the end of 2014, WAOE was operated through a joint sales agreement by Granite Broadcasting, then-owner of NBC affiliate WEEK-TV (channel 25). It shared facilities with that station and WHOI (which was operated by WEEK-TV through a separate joint sales and shared services agreement). The Springfield Road studios of WEEK-TV and WHOI once handled some internal operations (such as the maintenance of programming logs) of another Four Seasons Broadcasting station, WBQD-LP (now WQAD-DT3); however, that station was actually controlled through a local marketing agreement with the Quad Cities' ABC affiliate WQAD-TV (owned at the time by Local TV; now owned by Tegna Inc.), and most of its operations were run from WQAD's studios in Moline. Quincy Newspapers announced on February 11, 2014 that it would acquire WEEK-TV from Granite Broadcasting. Quincy planned on continuing to provide services to WAOE, but the JSA with Granite expired at the end of 2014.

In the spring of 2020, WAOE moved its transmitter to the former site of WWTO-TV near Oglesby, using WWTO's former VHF digital channel 10. On November 27, the station filed an application to move its city of license to Oswego, Illinois, in Kendall County (part of the Chicago market).

On September 8, 2021, WAOE applied to convert to a distributed transmission system (DTS) with the addition of a second (and effectively, main) transmitter atop the John Hancock Center.

Programming

Local programming
WAOE's local programming, branded as VPOD TV, formerly broadcast on its third digital subchannel. It consisted mostly of talk shows, many of which covered holistic and alternative wellness. The channel's arrangement with WAOE ended at the end of 2022, and WAOE-DT3 is currently silent.

In 2021, VPOD TV held the broadcast rights to the Chicago Thanksgiving Parade, which previously aired on WGN-TV. The arrangement was heavily criticized as few Chicago households had any access to WAOE, and the next year saw it returned to a Chicago-licensed station, WCIU-TV.

Syndicated programming
Before the switch to OnTV4U, syndicated programming on WAOE included Family Guy, American Dad!, How I Met Your Mother, The Office, Judge Judy, and The Doctors among others; the latter two shows now air on WYZZ-TV.

As of 2021, most of the non-local programming on WAOE, carried mostly on the VPOD TV subchannel, consists of public domain and low-cost barter syndicated fare.

Sports programming
From 2015 to 2019, WAOE was the Peoria broadcast affiliate for Chicago Bulls, Blackhawks, and White Sox games produced by WGN Sports, and Cubs broadcasts produced by WLS-TV after WGN America stopped carrying national sports telecasts of Chicago teams. Before then, WAOE was an affiliate of the St. Louis Cardinals television network from St. Louis' KPLR-TV.

WAOE was also the longtime local broadcaster of the Illinois High School Association final tournaments and championships for basketball and football. With WAOE's move out of the market, the telecasts moved to WEEK-DT3 in the fall of 2019.

Newscasts
On June 5, 2006, WEEK-TV established a news share agreement with WAOE and began producing a weeknight-only prime time newscast for the then-UPN affiliate. Known as Primetime News at Nine, the half-hour newscast competed with WYZZ-TV's half-hour newscast, produced by sister station WMBD-TV. WAOE also simulcast WEEK's morning news in full. In September 2006, the name was altered to News 25 at Nine on My59 to reflect WAOE's new affiliation. After the Granite JSA expired at the end of 2014, all WEEK-TV newscasts were dropped from WAOE.

Subchannels
The station's digital signal is multiplexed:

References

External links
 

Television channels and stations established in 1999
AOE
1999 establishments in Illinois